Anthony Gerhard Alexander (Anthon), Ridder van Rappard (5 October 1799, Utrecht – 1 April 1869, Utrecht) was a Dutch politician.

1799 births
1869 deaths
Ministers of State (Netherlands)
Ministers of the Interior of the Netherlands
Dutch civil servants
Dutch nobility
Utrecht University alumni
Politicians from Utrecht (city)